Malak Izvor refers to the following places in Bulgaria:

 Malak Izvor, Haskovo Province
 Malak Izvor, Lovech Province